The 2019 College Basketball Invitational (CBI) was a single-elimination men's college basketball tournament consisting of 16 National Collegiate Athletic Association (NCAA) Division I teams that did not participate in the 2019 NCAA Men's Division I Basketball Tournament or the NIT. It was held from March 19 through April 5, 2019 in various arenas. This event marked the 12th year the tournament has been held.

Participating teams
The following teams were announced as participants Sunday, March 17 after the NCAA Selection Show.

Declined invitations 
The following programs declined an invitation to play in the CBI.

 Bowling Green
 BYU
 Fresno State
 Jacksonville State
 Omaha
 San Francisco
 UTSA

Format
The 2019 CBI had 16 teams organized into four regional brackets of four teams. The four teams that advanced to the semifinals were reseeded. The finals were a best-of-three series.

Schedule

Bracket

Home teams listed first.
* Denotes overtime period.

References

External links
 College Basketball Invitational official website

College Basketball Invitational
College Basketball Invitational